Theoa elegans is a species of spiders in the family Linyphiidae. It is found in China and Thailand.

References

Linyphiidae
Spiders described in 2014
Spiders of China
Arthropods of Thailand